Kolbeinn Gíslason (born 16 December 1955) is an Icelandic judoka. He competed in the men's open category event at the 1984 Summer Olympics.

References

1955 births
Living people
Kolbeinn Gíslason
Kolbeinn Gíslason
Judoka at the 1984 Summer Olympics
Place of birth missing (living people)